HC Olomouc is an ice hockey team in the Czech Extraliga (first-level league) from Olomouc. They won the Extraliga championship in the 1993/1994 season. In 1997 the club sold the Extraliga license to HC Karlovy Vary, and was thus relegated to the second-level league. They returned to the Extraliga in 2014.

History
On 18 April 2014 they returned to the Extraliga by finishing 2nd in the relegation playoffs. 2014/2015 season started very well and by the end of year, team was on 5th place and even beaten elite team, HC Sparta Praha. But then a rapid fall came and the team fell from 5th place to 13th, thus it had to play play-outs and then relegation play-offs. They ended on 1st place, staying in league with Piráti Chomutov. HC Slavia Praha and ČEZ Motor České Budějovice were relegated.

Honours

Domestic
Czech Extraliga
  Winners (1): 1993–94

Czech 1. Liga
  Runners-up (2): 2012–13, 2013–14
  3rd place (3): 2007–08, 2009–10, 2011–12

1st. Czech National Hockey League
  Winners (1): 1982–83
  Runners-up (8): 1981–82, 1983–84, 1984–85, 1985–86, 1986–87, 1987–88, 1988–89, 1989–90

Players

Current roster

Famous players
 Pavel Brendl
 Jiří Hudler
 Michal Broš
 Jiří Dopita
 Ondřej Kratěna
 David Krejčí
 Jan Tomajko

References

External links
 Official website 

Ice hockey teams in the Czech Republic
Sport in Olomouc
1955 establishments in Czechoslovakia
Ice hockey clubs established in 1955